Rocket D.I.Y. is a studio album by Scottish singer-songwriter King Creosote, released on 4 April 2005 on Fence Records and Domino.

In 2009, the album was ranked #17 in The Skinny's "Scottish Albums of the Decade" list, with frequent collaborator The Pictish Trail stating, "Now, yes, I know, this was a Fence Records release, and, yes, I'm fully aware that I am a member of King Creosote's band. But I genuinely think, from start to finish, that this is the best album Scotland has produced since 01/01/00."

Track listing
"Twin Tub Twin" – 3:13
"Saffy Nool" – 4:37
"Klutz" – 2:11
"Crow's Feet" – 3:08
"Spooned Out On Tick" – 3:36
"pH 6.4" – 2:27
"Circle My Demise" – 3:19
"King Bubbles In Sand" – 1:49
"The Things, Things, Things" – 3:33
"A Month Of Firsts" – 4:10
"Thrills & Spills" – 3:01
"The Someone Else" – 2:42

References

2005 albums
Domino Recording Company albums
King Creosote albums